The Winnowing Basket mansion (箕宿, pinyin: Jī Xiù) is one of the Twenty-Eight Mansions of the Chinese constellations.  It is one of the eastern mansions of the Azure Dragon.

Asterisms

References 

Chinese constellations